Local elections were held in Armenia on 17 April 2016.

Results

Hrazdan
Aram Danielyan reelected mayor of Hrazdan.

References

Local elections in Armenia
Local
Armenia
Armenia
2010s in Armenian politics